Rosalind Goforth (6 May 1864 – 31 May 1942) was a British-born Canadian Presbyterian missionary, and author.

Born Florence Rosalind Bell-Smith near Kensington Gardens, London, England, she moved at three with her parents to Montreal, Quebec.

Her father, John Bell-Smith, was an artist, and she also intended to go into art. She graduated from the Toronto School of Art in May 1885, and she began preparing to return to London that autumn with the intention of completing her art studies.

Instead, however, she married Jonathan Goforth on 25 October 1887 at Knox Presbyterian Church, Toronto, Canada, and they both served God in Manchuria and China. 

They had eleven children, five of which died as babies or very young children. Rosalind died in Toronto, Canada, and is buried alongside her husband at Mount Pleasant Cemetery, Toronto.

Bibliography
 How I Know God Answers Prayer (1921)
 Chinese Diamonds for the King of Kings
 Goforth of China (1937)
 Climbing: Memoirs of a Missionary's Wife (1940)

References

External links
 
 
 
 Genealogy.com info on Rosalind Goforth

Presbyterian missionaries in China
1864 births
1942 deaths
Canadian Presbyterian missionaries
Canadian evangelicals
Presbyterian writers
English emigrants to Canada
Canadian expatriates in China
Female Christian missionaries
Women religious writers
Canadian women non-fiction writers
20th-century Canadian non-fiction writers
20th-century Canadian women writers
Writers from London
Burials at Mount Pleasant Cemetery, Toronto
OCAD University alumni